General Howell may refer to:

David Howell (British Army officer) (fl. 1970s–2010s), British Army major general
Joshua B. Howell (1806–1864), Union Army brigadier general
Philip Howell (1877–1916), British Army brigadier general
Scott A. Howell (born 1965), U.S. Air Force lieutenant general

See also
Attorney General Howell (disambiguation)